Epicrionops columbianus, the El Tambo caecilian, is a species of caecilian in the family Rhinatrematidae endemic to Colombia. It is known from the western slopes of the Cordillera Occidental in Cauca and Chocó Departments.

The species' natural habitats are montane forests where it occurs underground or among fallen leaves. Specific threats to it are unknown.

References

Epicrionops
Amphibians described in 1939
Amphibians of the Andes
Amphibians of Colombia
Endemic fauna of Colombia
Taxonomy articles created by Polbot